The Sultan's Wife is a 1917 American silent comedy film directed by Clarence G. Badger and starring Bobby Vernon and Gloria Swanson. The film is also known under the title Caught in a Harem.

Plot
Gloria follows sailor boyfriend Bobby to India. After she is kidnapped by the sultan, who wants her for his harem, Bobby must come to the rescue.

Cast
Gloria Swanson as Gloria
Bobby Vernon as Bobby
Joseph Callahan
Teddy the Dog
Gonda Durand
Phyllis Haver
Roxana McGowan
Vera Steadman
Edith Valk
Blanche Payson as Harem Matron (uncredited)

Reception
Like many American films of the time, The Sultan's Wife was subject to cuts by city and state film censorship boards. The Chicago Board of Censors required a cut of the scenes with a man on a bench wiggling his posterior after seeing dancers in the background, of the Sultan falling backwards after the dance and spreading his arms and legs, and of the man and woman knocking into each other.

References

External links

1917 films
1917 comedy films
1917 short films
Silent American comedy films
American silent short films
American black-and-white films
Films directed by Clarence G. Badger
Keystone Studios films
Films produced by Mack Sennett
American comedy short films
1910s American films